Gianni Mazza (born 5 October 1944) is an Italian composer, conductor, arranger, singer and television personality.

Born Giovanni Mazza in Rome, Mazza started his career as a musician in the late 1960s. In the 1970s he started composing film and television scores and participated as conductor at the Sanremo Music Festival in 1974 and in 1979. In the 1980s he became a popular television personality thanks to the participation as a conductor and a showman to some variety shows written and hosted by Renzo Arbore. In 1991 he entered the competition at the Sanremo Music Festival as a singer with the ironical song "Il lazzo".

References

Further reading
  Christian Calabrese. "Mazza e il lazzo di Sanremo". Musica leggera, n° 7. 2009.

External links

 
 
 

1944 births
Musicians from Rome
Living people
Italian music arrangers
Italian male conductors (music)
Italian film score composers
Italian male film score composers
Italian television personalities
21st-century Italian conductors (music)
21st-century Italian male musicians
Mass media people from Rome